Luisa Fernanda (born c. 1970) is a Mexican television presenter.

Luisa Fernanda may also refer to:
Luisa Fernanda of Spain (1832–1897), Infanta of Spain, Duchess of Montpensier
Luisa Fernanda Rudi Ubeda (born 1950), Spanish politician
Luisa Fernanda (telenovela), Venezuelan telenovella (1998–1999)
Luisa Fernanda (zarzuela), 1932 zarzuela by Federico Moreno Torroba